Babchenko (Cyrillic: Бабченко) is a Ukrainian surname. Notable people with the surname include:

Aleksandr Babchenko (born 1971), Kyrgyzstani sport shooter
Arkady Babchenko (born 1977), Russian journalist

See also
 

Ukrainian-language surnames